A chiller is a machine to remove heat from liquid.

Chiller may also refer to:

Entertainment
Chiller (video game), a video game
Chiller (TV network), a defunct NBCUniversal-owned cable channel specializing in horror
Chiller (TV series), British television series
Chiller Theatre (disambiguation), the name of multiple science fiction and horror movie programs
Chiller Cabinet, radio show created by Ben Eshmade
Wes Craven's Chiller, a made for TV horror/thriller released in 1985
Batman & Robin: The Chiller, a roller-coaster at Six Flags Great Adventure
Chiller, an episode of The Annoying Orange, spoof of Michael Jackson's Thriller
Chiller, the webtoon popularized by its story "Bongcheon-Dong Ghost"

Other
Water chiller, in relation to hydroponics
An Indian slang for change (small denominations of money given in return for a larger denominations)

See also
Cooler (disambiguation)
Chill (disambiguation)